To noč sem jo videl is a novel by Slovenian author Drago Jančar. It was first published in 2010.

See also
List of Slovenian novels

References
To noč sem jo videl, Modrijan.si, accessed 19 July 2012

Slovenian novels
2010 novels